Cawas Billimoria (born 25 October 1962) is an Indian judoka. He is a Parsi Zoroastrian. He competed in the men's heavyweight event at the 1992 Summer Olympics.

References

1962 births
Living people
Parsi people from Mumbai
Indian male judoka
Olympic judoka of India
Judoka at the 1992 Summer Olympics
Martial artists from Mumbai
Asian Games medalists in judo
Judoka at the 1986 Asian Games
Asian Games bronze medalists for India
Medalists at the 1986 Asian Games
Recipients of the Arjuna Award
20th-century Indian people